The Simpson Falls, a cascade waterfall on the West Ithaca Creek, is located within the Mount Coot-tha Forest, in Brisbane, Queensland, Australia.

Location and features
These two areas make up a  forest that extends into suburban Brisbane. It is home to powerful owls, goshawks, eagles, wrens and robins as well as possums and bats. Visitor facilities in the forest include picnic tables, barbecues and toilets. The forest may be approached from Sir Samuel Griffith Drive or Gap Creek Road, Mt Coot-tha. Limited parking is available. The area is popular with birdwatchers, who can see white-throated treecreeper, variegated fairy-wren, powerful owl, rose robin and varied sittella.

In 2006 a 58-year-old Bardon woman was walking her dog through the Mount Coot-tha picnic spot Simpson Falls when two dingoes stalked and circled her for a kilometre. Brisbane City Council erected warning signs and set additional traps in response to the incident.

Brisbane City Council occasionally burns sections of bush around Simpson Falls to prevent fuel build up.

See also

 List of waterfalls of Queensland

References

External links
 National Public Toilet Map, Simpson Falls, Queensland, Australia
 National Public Toilet Map, Mount Coot-tha, Queensland, Australia
 Ithaca Creek group on Flickr

Waterfalls of Queensland
Geography of Brisbane